The 2020–21 Kansas City Roos men's basketball team represented the University of Missouri–Kansas City in the 2020–21 NCAA Division I men's basketball season. The Roos, led by 2nd-year head coach Billy Donlon, played their home games at the Swinney Recreation Center in Kansas City, Missouri, as members of the Summit League.

This season marked Kansas City's return to the Summit League, after spending the previous seven seasons as members of the Western Athletic Conference.

Previous season
The Roos finished the 2019–20 season 16–14, 8–7 in WAC play to finish in fourth place. They were set to be the No. 5 seed in the WAC tournament, however, the tournament was cancelled amid the COVID-19 pandemic.

Roster

Schedule and results

|-
!colspan=12 style=| Non-conference regular season

|-
!colspan=9 style=| Summit League regular season

|-
!colspan=12 style=| Summit League tournament
|-

|-

Source

References

Kansas City Roos men's basketball seasons
Kansas City Roos
Kansas City Roos men's basketball
Kansas City Roos men's basketball